The 1874 Northampton by-election was fought on 6 October 1874.  The byelection was fought due to the death of the incumbent Liberal MP, Charles Gilpin.  It was won by the Conservative candidate Charles George Merewether.

References

1874 elections in the United Kingdom
1874 in England
19th century in Northamptonshire
Politics of Northampton
By-elections to the Parliament of the United Kingdom in Northamptonshire constituencies
October 1874 events